Patrick Joseph Schiltz (born July 6, 1960) is an American lawyer who serves as the chief United States district judge of the United States District Court for the District of Minnesota.

Education and career

Patrick J. Schiltz was born and raised in Duluth, Minnesota. He graduated summa cum laude in 1981 from the College of St. Scholastica and magna cum laude in 1985 from Harvard Law School, where he was an editor of the Harvard Law Review. During the gap year between college and law school, Schiltz worked as a Legislative Aide to U.S. Senator Dave Durenberger (R-Minn).

After graduating from law school, Schiltz served as a law clerk to Antonin Scalia, who was then a judge of the United States Court of Appeals for the District of Columbia Circuit. Schiltz had agreed to clerk for Justice Sandra Day O'Connor on the United States Supreme Court following his clerkship with Scalia. But shortly before Schiltz's clerkship with Scalia ended, Scalia was nominated to the United States Supreme Court. Scalia asked Schiltz to help prepare him for his confirmation hearings, and, after Scalia’s nomination was confirmed, Scalia asked Schiltz to clerk for him during his first year at the Supreme Court. With O’Connor’s permission, Schiltz agreed.

Following his clerkship with Scalia, Schiltz joined Faegre & Benson in Minneapolis. Schiltz represented the National Football League, the Minnesota Vikings, and the Minnesota Timberwolves in antitrust and contract law; the Star Tribune and other media clients in access and libel litigation; and the Evangelical Lutheran Church in America and other religious organizations in tort and employment matters.

Schiltz left private practice in 1995 to join the faculty of Notre Dame Law School, where he taught civil procedure, evidence, and sports law. While at Notre Dame, Schiltz wrote "On Being a Happy, Healthy, and Ethical Member of an Unhappy, Unhealthy, and Unethical Profession," one of the most widely read law-review articles ever published. The Vanderbilt Law Review made the article the focus of a symposium, and the Washington Post identified the article as one of nine works that every law student should read.

In 2000, Schiltz left Notre Dame to become the founding associate dean of the University of St. Thomas School of Law in Minnesota. Schiltz had primary responsibility for almost every significant aspect of creating the new law school, from hiring the faculty to designing the building. In 2002, Schiltz was named the St. Thomas More Chair in Law, the first endowed chair at the School of Law.

From 1997 to 2006, Schiltz served as the Reporter to the Advisory Committee on the Federal Rules of Appellate Procedure. Among those who served on the Committee during Schiltz’s tenure were future Supreme Court Justices John G. Roberts, Jr. and Samuel A. Alito, Jr.

Federal judicial service

On December 14, 2005, President George W. Bush nominated Schiltz to serve on the United States District Court for the District of Minnesota after Judge Richard H. Kyle assumed senior status. The Senate confirmed Schiltz's appointment on April 26, 2006, and he received his commission two days later. He became chief judge on July 1, 2022.

See also 
 List of law clerks of the Supreme Court of the United States (Seat 9)

References

External links 

1960 births
Living people
21st-century American judges
College of St. Scholastica alumni
Harvard Law School alumni
Judges of the United States District Court for the District of Minnesota
Law clerks of the Supreme Court of the United States
Notre Dame Law School faculty
People from Duluth, Minnesota
United States district court judges appointed by George W. Bush